Sir Oliver Heald  (born 15 December 1954) is a British barrister and Conservative Party politician serving as the Member of Parliament (MP) for North East Hertfordshire, formerly North Hertfordshire, since 1992.

Background

Heald was born in Reading, Berkshire, and was educated at the Reading School and Pembroke College, Cambridge, where he read Law. He was called to the Bar at the Middle Temple in 1977 and was a practising barrister in London and East Anglia at Fenners Chambers in Cambridge from 1979 until he was appointed a Government Minister in 1995.

He became the Chairman of the North Hertfordshire Conservative Association for two years from 1984. He unsuccessfully contested the London Borough of Southwark seat of Southwark and Bermondsey at the 1987 general election but finished in third place 12,550 votes behind the sitting Liberal MP Simon Hughes. He became the Vice-President of the Southwark and Bermondsey Conservative Association in 1988 for five years, becoming the President for five years from 1993.

Early career

Heald was elected to the House of Commons for North Hertfordshire at the 1992 general election following the retirement of the Conservative MP Ian Stewart. He held the seat with a majority of 16,531 and has remained an MP since. He made his maiden speech on 9 June 1992 in which he spoke of his political beginnings on a soapbox at Speakers' Corner.

In Parliament he served on the Education Select committee for two years from 1992. He was appointed as the Parliamentary Private Secretary (PPS) to the Minister of State at the Home Office Peter Lloyd in 1994. Later in the year he became the PPS to the Minister of Agriculture, Fisheries and Food, William Waldegrave.

He was promoted to serve in the Government of John Major in 1995 when he was appointed as the Parliamentary Under Secretary of State at the Department of Social Security, where he remained until the fall of the Conservative government in 1997. In 1995 he introduced the Insurance Companies (Reserves) Act.

In Opposition

The seat he represented was abolished in 1997 and since that general election he has been returned to Parliament for the new seat of North East Hertfordshire. After the election he became an Opposition Whip under the new leadership of William Hague, before moving on to become a Spokesman for Home Affairs with responsibility for police matters. He was made a Spokesman for Health by Iain Duncan Smith in 2001. 

He joined Michael Howard's Shadow Cabinet as the Shadow Leader of the House of Commons in 2003. In 2004 he was then appointed to serve as Shadow Secretary of State for Constitutional Affairs and in 2005 was appointed by David Cameron as the Shadow Chancellor of the Duchy of Lancaster.

In July 2007 he became a backbencher following 13 years' continuous service on the Conservative Front Bench. From November 2007 to September 2012 he was a member of the Work and Pensions Select Committee, and from March 2008 – September 2012 he was a member of the Committee on Standards in Public Life. 

From July 2010 until September 2012 he was appointed to the House of Commons Standards and Privileges Committee and he has also been a member of the UK Delegation to the Council of Europe.

Return to Government
In 2012, Heald returned to Government as Solicitor-General even though he had previously helped to lead the rebellion against the House of Lords Reform Bill which he vociferously opposed. However, he did not actually vote for or against the Bill which probably helped his chances of promotion. On 29 September 2016, he was appointed to the Privy Council of the United Kingdom and may therefore use the style The Right Honourable.

Heald was opposed to Brexit prior to the 2016 referendum. In December 2017 Heald voted with fellow Conservative Dominic Grieve and nine other Conservative MPs against the government, and in favour of guaranteeing Parliament a "meaningful vote" on any deal Theresa May agrees with Brussels over Brexit.

Heald was knighted in the 2014 Special Honours.

Personal life
Heald became the Executive Chairman of the Society of Conservative Lawyers in July 2008. He takes a particular interest in healthcare.

He and his wife Christine (née Whittle) live in his Hertfordshire constituency, in the market town of Royston; they have a son and two daughters. His daughter Sarah stood as a Conservative candidate in Manchester Withington in the 2017 election.

References

External links
Oliver Heald MP official site
Oliver Heald's Blog official blog

Open Rights Group – Oliver Heald MP

|-

|-

|-

|-

|-

|-

1954 births
Alumni of Pembroke College, Cambridge
Conservative Party (UK) MPs for English constituencies
English barristers
English King's Counsel
Knights Bachelor
Living people
Members of the Middle Temple
Members of the Privy Council of the United Kingdom
People educated at Reading School
21st-century King's Counsel
UK MPs 1992–1997
UK MPs 1997–2001
UK MPs 2001–2005
UK MPs 2005–2010
UK MPs 2010–2015
UK MPs 2015–2017
UK MPs 2017–2019
UK MPs 2019–present
Member of the Committee on Standards in Public Life
Politicians awarded knighthoods